Allen & Gledhill LLP is a Singapore law firm with a regional network of associate firms and offices. It is the largest law firm in Singapore, and is a regional market leader in many practices, particularly banking, finance, capital markets, corporate law, M&A law, and other transactional and advisory matters. The firm provides legal services to local companies and MNCs, financial institutions, and individual clients.

History
Allen & Gledhill is one of Singapore's oldest law firms, founded by Rowland Allen and Joseph Gledhill in 1902. In 1959, it set up an office in Malaysia, which became independent in 1972. The Malaysian firm later merged with the firm Lee Hishammuddin to form Lee Hishammuddin Allen & Gledhill.

In November 2011, UK international law firm Allen & Overy indicated that it was exploring the possibility of a merger with the firm. The merger talks ended in March 2012.

Allen & Gledhill was reported by Asian Legal Business in 2021 to be the largest law firm in Singapore by headcount and the 44th largest domestic law firm in Asia.

Accolades
Over the years, the firm has received numerous awards, including: 

 International Financial Law Review (IFLR) Asia-Pacific Awards 2022 Regional Law Firm of the Year and National Law Firm of the Year (Singapore)
 Chambers Asia-Pacific Awards 2022 Singapore Corporate & Finance Domestic Law Advisers award
 The Legal 500 Southeast Asia Legal Awards 20/21 Regional Law Firm of the Year
 Asian Legal Business SE Asia Law Awards 2021 SE Asia Law Firm of the Year, Singapore Law Firm of the Year, Banking and Financial Services Firm of the Year, Labour and Employment Firm of the Year, Real Estate Law Firm of the Year, Restructuring Law Firm of the Year, Singapore Intellectual Property Law Firm of the Year, Tax and Trusts Law Firm of the Year, and Rising Law Firm of the Year (for its Myanmar office)

The firm was ranked as a leading law firm by Chambers & Partners in the Chambers Asia-Pacific 2022 for

 Singapore in the areas of 
 Banking & Finance, Capital Markets, Competition/Antitrust, Construction, Corporate Investigations/Anti-Corruption, Corporate/M&A, Employment, Intellectual Property, Investment Funds, Projects & Energy, Real Estate, Restructuring/Insolvency, Shipping, Startups & Emerging Companies, Tax and Technology, Media, Telecoms.
 Myanmar in the area of
 General Business Law
 Indonesia in the area of
 Corporate & Finance (International Firms)

Notable people 
Allen & Gledhill is home to three Senior Counsel. Several Singapore politicians have worked there , including K. Shanmugam, the Minister for Home Affairs and Minister for Law, and Edwin Tong, the Minister for Community, Culture, and Youth. Former Managing Partner, Lee Kim Shin, was appointed Judicial Commissioner of the Supreme Court in 2013. Former partner, Ang Cheng Hock, made a Judge of the Supreme Court in 2018. Former chairman and senior partner Lucien Wong, who was the only Singapore lawyer to be named as one of Asia’s top 25 M&A lawyers by Asian Legal Business in 2009, was appointed Attorney-General of Singapore in December 2016. Former partner Lai Siu Chiu was the first woman to be made a judge in Singapore.

References

Law firms of Singapore
Law firms established in 1902
1902 establishments in Singapore